Karim Boudjema (born September 8, 1988 in Lyon) is a French-Algerian footballer. He currently plays for MO Béjaïa in Algerian Ligue Professionnelle 1.

Honours
 Won the Singapore League Cup once with Etoile FC in 2010
 Won the S.League once with Etoile FC in 2010

External links
 Etoile FC Profile
 

1988 births
Living people
Footballers from Lyon
Algerian footballers
Expatriate footballers in Singapore
French footballers
French sportspeople of Algerian descent
Singapore Premier League players
Algerian expatriates in Singapore
Othellos Athienou F.C. players
Expatriate footballers in Cyprus
Cypriot Second Division players
GOAL FC players
Association football midfielders
Association football forwards
Étoile FC players